Mira Place() is a shopping centre in Tsim Sha Tsui, Kowloon, Hong Kong. It is located at 132-134 Nathan Road, at the corner with Kimberley Road.

It is connected by a footbridge to Mira Place Two (formerly Miramar ShoppingCentre) a smaller shopping centre owned by the same company, which is home to the first branch of Don Don Donki in Hong Kong.

History
Mira Place was built in 2008, where it was renovated for 4 billion dollars. It was renamed to Mira Place Hong Kong after it was renovated.

See also
 The Mira Hong Kong – the connected hotel

References

External links

 Official website

Shopping centres in Hong Kong
Tsim Sha Tsui
1996 establishments in Hong Kong